I Am Your Father is a 2015 Spanish documentary film written and directed by Toni Bestard (es) and Marcos Cabotá (es). The film deals with actor David Prowse many years after he played the role of Darth Vader in the original Star Wars trilogy.

Synopsis
David Prowse is a bodybuilder and actor who famously portrayed the role of Darth Vader in Star Wars, The Empire Strikes Back, and Return of the Jedi. Unlike most of the other  Star Wars stars, however, he is relatively obscure, since James Earl Jones dubbed Vader's voice and Sebastian Shaw portrayed an unmasked Vader (in Return of the Jedi). Prowse lived anonymously in Croydon, a suburb of London.

The story begins when a young filmmaker travels to London to propose that Prowse reshoot scenes from the trilogy, to prove that Prowse could have played Darth Vader in that particular scene. In a symbolic way, the directors, assisted by a group of enthusiastic fans, will try to give Prowse the recognition he never had.

In this documentary, the directors find some clues about the difficult relationship between Prowse and Lucasfilm, suggesting that the reason for their differences was an article published by a British newspaper during the shooting of Return of the Jedi.

Cast
 David Prowse, Actor / Darth Vader
 Kenny Baker, Actor / R2-D2
 Michael Atiyeh, colorist for Star Wars comics
 Marcus Hearn, author of The Cinema of George Lucas
 Gary Kurtz, producer of Star Wars and The Empire Strikes Back
 Brian Muir, Darth Vader helmet sculptor
 Robert Watts, Star Wars producer
 Jeremy Bulloch, Actor / Boba Fett
 Lou Ferrigno, Actor

Production
The film was developed by production companies IB3, Nova Televisió, Singular Audiovisual, and Strange Friends.

Release
I Am Your Father was originally released in Spain on 20 November 2015. The film was later released internationally through Netflix in September 2016. The film was also featured at the 47th International Film Festival of India in November 2016.

References

External links
 

2015 films
2015 documentary films
Documentary films about films
Spanish documentary films
2010s Spanish-language films
Star Wars documentaries
2010s English-language films